Dawei District is a district of the Taninthayi Division of Myanmar. The district covers an area of 13,792 km2, and had a population of 493,576 at the 2014 Census.

Administrative divisions

Townships
The district contains the following townships:

Dawei Township
Launglon Township
Thayetchaung Township
Yebyu Township

Subtownships
 Kaleinaung Subtownship
 Myitta Subtownship

References

Districts of Myanmar
Tanintharyi Region